The Fantasies (German Fantasien), Op. 116 for solo piano were composed by Johannes Brahms in the Austrian town of Bad Ischl during the summer of 1892. The set consists of seven pieces entitled Capriccio or Intermezzo, though Brahms originally considered using "Notturno" for No. 4 and "Intermezzo" for No. 7. The pieces were published by N. Simrock in December 1892, and represent the end of Brahms's long break from composing piano pieces. The seven movements are:
 Capriccio in D minor. Presto energico
 Intermezzo in A minor. Andante
 Capriccio in G minor. Allegro passionato
 Intermezzo in E major. Adagio
 Intermezzo in E minor. Andante con grazia ed intimissimo sentimento
 Intermezzo in E major. Andantino teneramente
 Capriccio in D minor. Allegro agitato

References

External links 
 Fantasies, Op. 116 played by Emil Gilels

Piano pieces by Johannes Brahms
Compositions for solo piano
1892 compositions